Events from the year 2001 in Denmark.

Incumbents
 Monarch – Margrethe II
 Prime minister – Poul Nyrup Rasmussen (until November 27), Anders Fogh Rasmussen

Events
 15 May – Copenhagen Malmö Port as a trans-national port authority in the Øresund Region is established, the official opening ceremony is held on 15 May.

The arts

Architecture

Film
 February – Lone Scherfig's film Italian for Beginners receives a Silver Bear in the Jury Prize category at the 2001 International Film Festival.

Literature

Music
 1 April — The Hope by Frederik Magle is premiered, commemorating the Battle of Copenhagen, on the eve of the 200th anniversary of the battle.

Sports

Badminton
 310 June  Denmark wins one silver medal and two bronze medals at the 2001 IBF World Championships.

Other
 6 February — Jakob Piil wins Grand Prix d'Ouverture La Marseillaise.

 4 March — Thomas Bjørn wins Dubai Desert Classic on the 2001 European Tour.

 17 June — Tom Kristensen wins the 2001 24 Hours of Le Mans as part of the Audi team, his third win of the 24 Hours of Le Mans race.
Undated
 Badminton BK wins Europe Cup.

Births
15 January – Mathias Ross, footballer
7 April
Ahmed Daghim, footballer
Morten Frendrup, footballer
19 April – Gustav Isaksen, footballer
18 June – Nikolas Dyhr, footballer
16 November – Oliver Villadsen, footballer

Deaths
 24 January – Leif Thybo, composer (born 1922)
 30 June – Johannes Sløk, philosopher and writer (born 1916)
 16 December – Villy Sørensen, philosopher and writer (born 1929)

See also
2001 in Danish television

References

 
Denmark
Years of the 21st century in Denmark
Denmark
2000s in Denmark